Statistics of Swiss Super League in the 1951–52 season.

Overview
It was contested by 14 teams, and Grasshopper Club Zürich won the championship.

League standings

Results

Sources 
 Switzerland 1951–52 at RSSSF

Swiss Football League seasons
Swiss
1951–52 in Swiss football